Kindleoceras is a genus of oncocerids belonging to the  Valcouroceratidae, extinct nautiloid cephalopods that lived during the Middle and Late Ordovician.

Kindleoceras is characterized by a gently curved or virtually straight shell, the cross section of which is triangular with flattened dorsum and subangular venter.
The siphuncle is small, ventral, cyrtochoanitic with outwardly flared necks, thickened rings, and well developed radial internal actinosiphonate deposits.

In general form Kindleoceras is similar to Manitoulinoceras except for its triangular cross section. Augustoceras, another valcouroceratid, differs in that the rays in its actinosiphonate deposits are longer but less numerous.

Kindleoceras, named by Foeste, has been found in the Middle and Upper Ordovician of Ontario in Canada.

References

 Walter C Sweet, 1964  Nautiloidea-Oncocerida.  Treatise on Invertebrate Paleontology Part K Mollusca 3. Geological Society of America and University of Kansas Press

Oncocerida
Prehistoric nautiloid genera
Middle Ordovician first appearances
Late Ordovician extinctions
Paleozoic life of Ontario